Annadaata (English: My Father) is a 2002 Bengali film directed by Ravi Kinagi and produced by  Kusum Dhanuka under the banner of  Eskay Movies. The film features actors Prosenjit Chatterjee and Sreelekha Mitra in the lead roles. Music of the film was composed by Babul Bose. The film was a remake of 1990 Hindi film Swarg which was a loosely based on 1967 movie Mehrban which itself was a remake of the 1960 Tamil movie Padikkadha Medhai which in turn was a remake of 1953 Bengali film Jog Biyog based on the novel of same name by Ashapoorna Devi. The film stars Prosenjit Chatterjee in role of Shankar which was played by Govinda as Krishna in Swarg whereas Abdur Razzak played the role of Rajesh Khanna.

Cast 
 Prasenjit Chatterjee as Shankar
 Sreelekha Mitra as Barsha
 Abdur Razzak (actor) as Amar Chowdhury
 Anuradha Ray as Shanti Dev
 Dulal Lahiri as Rudraprasad Sen
 Bharat Kaul as Vikram
 Siddhanta Mahapatra as Special appearance in an item song named "Dhekhi joto soundoro"
 Rajesh Sharma as Film Director

Production 
Initially Rituparna Sengupta was offered to play the role of Barsha. After she refused, Mouli Ganguly and then Rachna Banerjee were considered for the role. After both of them eschewed the role, it went to Sreelekha Mitra.

Soundtrack

References

External links
 

2002 films
2000s Bengali-language films
Bengali-language Indian films
Bengali remakes of Hindi films
Indian family films
Indian drama films
Films based on works by Ashapurna Devi